FIPS or Fips may refer to:

Computing
FIPS (computer program), First nondestructive Interactive Partition Splitter, a disk partitioner
Federal Information Processing Standards, United States government standards

People
Werner Fürbringer (1888–1982), German U-boat commander
Philipp Rupprecht (1900–1975), pen name of the German cartoonist

Games 
 Fips or Fipsen, a north German card game.

See also

FIP (disambiguation)